The Phantom 14 is an American sailing dinghy that was designed by Jack Howie as a racer and first built in 1977. It is a board sailboat, similar to the Sunfish.

Production
The design was built by Howmar Boats in Edison, New Jersey, United States from 1977 until the company went out of business in 1983. A total of 9,000 boats were completed, but it is now out of production.

Design
The Phantom 14 is a recreational sailboat, built predominantly of fiberglass. It has a Lateen rig, a raked stem, a vertical transom, a transom-hung rudder controlled by a tiller and a retractable daggerboard. It displaces .

The design uses sail sleeves, with the hard-coated aluminum spars inserted into the sleeves to rig the boat. This results in less aerodynamic drag and creates an even sail shape. The boat is equipped with hiking straps and has a storage compartment in the cockpit. The hull has a high bow design and molded in coaming to reduce the submarining of the bow that is common with "board boats". The sail halyard is routed through the coaming.

The design has a Portsmouth Yardstick racing average handicap of 103.7 (suspect) and is normally raced by one sailor.

See also
List of sailing boat types
DC‐14 Phantom - a boat with a similar name
Phantom (dinghy) - a catboat with a similar name
Phantom 14 (catamaran) - a boat with the same name
Phantom 16 (catamaran) - a boat with a similar name

Similar sailboats
Dolphin 15 Senior
Sunfish (sailboat)

References

Dinghies
1970s sailboat type designs
Sailboat type designs by Jack Howie
Sailboat types built by Howmar Boats